Carolina Martene Miranda Morais a.k.a. Carol (born April 13, 1986) is a team handball player from Angola. She plays on the Angola women's national handball team, and participated at the 2011 World Women's Handball Championship in Brazil and the 2012 Summer Olympics in London.

At club level, she plays for Norwegian side Vipers Kristiansand, having previously played for Primeiro de Agosto.

Achievements 
EHF Champions League:
Winner: 2020/2021
Bronze Medalist: 2018/2019
Norwegian League:
Winner: 2018/2019, 2019/2020, 2020/2021
Norwegian Cup:
Winner: 2019, 2020

References

External links

1986 births
Living people
Angolan female handball players
Handball players at the 2012 Summer Olympics
Olympic handball players of Angola
Handball players from Luanda
African Games gold medalists for Angola
African Games medalists in handball
Competitors at the 2011 All-Africa Games